A list of films produced in France in 1952. An increasing number of films were made as co-productions with Italy and other nations.

A–Z

Documentaries and shorts

See also
 1952 in France

References

External links
 French films of 1952 at the Internet Movie Database
French films of 1952 at Cinema-francais.fr

1952
Films
French